Hillary Ronen is an American politician and attorney serving as a member of the San Francisco Board of Supervisors from District 9, which includes the neighborhoods of Mission District, Bernal Heights, and Portola.

Early life and education 
Ronen's father immigrated to the United States from Israel in his twenties. Her mother was a school teacher. She has a Bachelor of Arts degree from the University of California, San Diego and her Juris Doctor from University of California, Berkeley.

Career
After graduating from law school, she moved to the Mission District, where she joined La Raza Centro Legal. She worked as an immigrant rights attorney.

San Francisco Board of Supervisors 
Ronen was a legislative aide and chief of staff to Supervisor David Campos. As an aide for Campos, she defended his proposals to prohibit the construction of market-rate housing in parts of San Francisco. She succeeded him on the San Francisco Board of Supervisors after winning election in the November 2016 election. Ronen was sworn in on January 9, 2017. Her election created a female majority on the board for the first time in 20 years.

During the 2018 San Francisco mayoral special election, Ronen voted with the majority to remove London Breed as interim mayor. Ronen explained her vote by stating her belief that Breed was being supported by "white, rich men" and "billionaires" such as Ron Conway who "have steered the policies for the past mayoral administrations . . . that have gotten us into the absolute mess that we are in today, where poor people and people of color cannot afford to live in the city." Ronen's choice for interim mayor, Mark Farrell, was a white male venture capitalist whose firm Conway had invested in. Breed was ultimately elected as mayor on June 5, 2018.

Positions on police 
In 2020, Ronen called for defunding the police. She felt a small 2.6 percent reduction of the police budget was not large enough and “a slap in the face.”
On March 15, 2023, Ronen stated she feels "betrayed" by the San Francisco Police Department, the mayor, and "the priorities of the city", after "begging this department to give the Mission what it deserves in terms of police presence all year long".

Positions on housing 
In 2018, Ronen fought to prevent the construction of a 75-unit building on the site of a laundromat. She argued that an environmental review of the building did not consider the impact of a shadow on a nearby schoolyard, even though an environmental review conducted by officials at the San Francisco Planning Department showed that the new construction, including its shadow, would not have an adverse impact on children at the schoolyard. In October of that same year, Ronen dropped her opposition, stating that the appeal process seeking to halt the project had been exhausted, thus allowing the project to proceed.

In 2019, she co-sponsored a resolution opposing California Senate Bill 50 which would have mandated denser housing near public transit stations and jobs centers in order to reduce the housing shortage in California.

In 2021, when San Francisco City Attorney Dennis Herrera sued a real estate developer for building 29 apartments in a building lot designated for 10 apartments, Ronen celebrated the decision and said that she had complained about the building for years.

In October 2021, Ronen voted against the construction of a 495-unit apartment complex (one-quarter of which were designated as affordable housing) on a Nordstrom's valet parking lot next to a BART station. Her vote was unusual, as she was blocking construction of housing in the district of another supervisors. The norm on the board is generally to honor the wishes of the district supervisor, who in this case was Matt Haney, a supporter of the proposed construction. After the vote, The San Francisco Chronicle editorial board wrote that the Board of Supervisors "have lost their minds on housing" and that San Francisco "needs a Board of Supervisors that won’t sabotage any and seemingly all earnest attempts to deal with this city’s housing crisis." The California Department of Housing and Community Development began an investigation into whether the San Francisco Board of Supervisors acted improperly in its decision to block the housing project. Ronen defended her vote, saying she was "pro-housing."

Personal life 
Ronen is married to attorney Francisco Ugarte. They live in the Bernal Heights neighborhood with their daughter.

References

External links 

 

21st-century American politicians
Living people
San Francisco Board of Supervisors members
Women city councillors in California
21st-century American women politicians
Year of birth missing (living people)
Jewish American people in California politics
University of California, San Diego alumni
University of California, Berkeley faculty
American people of Israeli descent
21st-century American Jews